Legislative elections were held in El Salvador on 24 April 1960. The result was a victory for the Revolutionary Party of Democratic Unification, which won all 54 seats after the Central Electoral Council had disqualified the candidates of the Renovating Action Party in seven of fourteen constituencies.

Results

References

Bibliography
Political Handbook of the world, 1960. New York, 1961. 
Benítez Manaut, Raúl. 1990. "El Salvador: un equilibrio imperfecto entre los votos y las botas." Secuencia 17:71-92 (mayo-agosto de 1990).
Eguizábal, Cristina. 1984. "El Salvador: elecciones sin democracia." Polemica (Costa Rica) 14/15:16-33 (marzo-junio 1984).
Institute for the Comparative Study of Political Systems. 1967. El Salvador election factbook, March 5, 1967. Washington: Institute for the Comparative Study of Political Systems.
Kantor, Harry. 1969. Patterns of politics and political systems in Latin America. Chicago: Rand McNally & Company.
Ruddle, Kenneth. 1972. Latin American political statistics. supplement to the statistical abstract of Latin America. Los Angeles: Latin American Center, UCLA.
Webre, Stephen. 1979. José Napoleón Duarte and the Christian Democratic Party in Salvadoran Politics 1960-1972. Baton Rouge: Louisiana State University Press.
Williams, Philip J. and Knut Walter. 1997. Militarization and demilitarization in El Salvador's transition to democracy. Pittsburgh: University of Pittsburgh Press.

El Salvador
Legislative elections in El Salvador
1960 in El Salvador
Election and referendum articles with incomplete results